The Cincinnati Bengals franchise was founded in 1968 as a member of the West division of the American Football League (AFL). The Bengals joined the National Football League (NFL) as a result of the AFL–NFL merger before . This list documents the franchise's completed seasons from 1968 to present, including postseason records and results from postseason games. The Bengals have played over 850 games in their history, including three conference championships, ten division championships, and fifteen playoff appearances.

The franchise has experienced several extended periods of success in their history. However, during a fourteen-year span—1991 to 2004—the Bengals did not qualify for the playoffs. During this time, the franchise had nine seasons with ten or more losses, and three of those seasons the franchise had the league's worst record. Between 2005 and 2015, the Bengals were more successful, posting seven winning seasons, three division titles and seven wild card playoff berths (including a streak of five consecutive playoff seasons, a first in franchise history). Despite the success, the Bengals did not win a playoff game between 1990 and 2021, one of the longest droughts in league history. From 2016 to 2020, the Bengals suffered five straight losing seasons, including having the league's worst record in the 2019 season (finishing 2–14 that season), before winning the AFC North and qualifying for the playoffs again in 2021, which included an AFC Championship Game win and a berth in their first Super Bowl since the 1988 season.

Legend

Season records

Footnotes
 The 1982 season was a strike-shortened season so the league was divided up into two conferences instead of its normal divisional alignment.
 The strike of 1987 reduced the regular season schedule from 16 to 15 games.

References

General
 
 
 
 

Specific

External links
 Cincinnati Bengals season database

 
Cincinnati Bengals
seasons